Komronshokh Ustopiriyon (born 7 January 1993) is a Tajikistani judoka.

He competed at the 2016 Summer Olympics in Rio de Janeiro, in the men's 90 kg.

References

External links

 
 

1993 births
Living people
Tajikistani male judoka
Olympic judoka of Tajikistan
Judoka at the 2016 Summer Olympics
Judoka at the 2014 Asian Games
Judoka at the 2018 Asian Games
Sambo practitioners at the 2018 Asian Games
Medalists at the 2018 Asian Games
Asian Games bronze medalists for Tajikistan
Asian Games medalists in judo
Asian Games medalists in sambo
Judoka at the 2020 Summer Olympics
20th-century Tajikistani people
21st-century Tajikistani people